Yevgeney Yatsinenko (January 8, 1925 – December 15, 2013) was a Soviet sprint canoeist who competed in the late 1950s. He won a silver medal in the K-2 1000 m event at the 1958 ICF Canoe Sprint World Championships in Prague. Yatsinenko also finish fifth in the K-2 10000 m event at the 1956 Summer Olympics in Melbourne.

References

Yevgeny Yatsinenko's profile at Sports Reference.com
Yevgeny Yatsinenko's obituary 

1925 births
2013 deaths
Canoeists at the 1956 Summer Olympics
Olympic canoeists of the Soviet Union
Soviet male canoeists
Russian male canoeists
ICF Canoe Sprint World Championships medalists in kayak